Anthony Averett (born November 30, 1994) is an American football cornerback who is a free agent. He played college football at Alabama.

Early years
Averett attended Woodbury Junior-Senior High School in Woodbury, New Jersey. He played football and ran track in high school. At the 2012 Penn Relays, he placed second in the long jump. His senior year, he was one of the best high school long jumpers in the nation,  with a jump of 25 feet, two inches, which was the second-longest jump in New Jersey history. He also ran 10.6 seconds in the 100-meters, 6.46 seconds in the 55 meters and high jumped 6 feet, 4 inches. In football, he played defensive back and quarterback. Averett committed to the University of Alabama to play college football.

College career
Averett redshirted his first year at Alabama in 2013 and played in only one game in 2014. In 2015, he played special teams, recording two tackles. Averett became a starter in 2016 and played in all 15 games, finishing with 48 tackles, one interception and also one sack .

Professional career

Baltimore Ravens
Averett was drafted by the Baltimore Ravens in the fourth round, 118th overall, of the 2018 NFL Draft.

On October 22, 2020, Averett was placed on injured reserve with a shoulder injury. He was activated on December 8, 2020.

On October 3, 2021, Averett intercepted Denver Broncos quarterback Drew Lock in the end zone, and helped the Baltimore Ravens win 23-7. On December 26, in the team's week 16 game against the Cincinnati Bengals, Averett suffered a fractured rib after taking a hit from Bengals tight end C. J. Uzomah.

Las Vegas Raiders
Averett signed with the Las Vegas Raiders on March 17, 2022. He was placed on injured reserve on September 12, 2022, after suffering a broken thumb in Week 1. He was activated on October 22. He was placed back on injured reserve on November 29.

Personal life
Averett is the nephew of Pro Bowl left tackle Bryant McKinnie.

References

External links

Alabama Crimson Tide bio
Baltimore Ravens bio

1994 births
Living people
Alabama Crimson Tide football players
American football cornerbacks
Baltimore Ravens players
Las Vegas Raiders players
Players of American football from New Jersey
Sportspeople from Woodbury, New Jersey
Woodbury Junior-Senior High School alumni